MD7 or MD-7 may refer to:
 Maryland Route 7
 Maryland's 7th congressional district
 Moorish Delta 7, a British hip-hop group